Israel competed at the 2022 World Aquatics Championships in Budapest, Hungary from 18 June to 3 July.

Artistic swimming

Israel entered 10 artistic swimmers.

Women

 Legend: (R) = Reserve Athlete

Open water swimming

Israel qualified two male and one female open water swimmers.

Men

Women

Swimming

Israel entered 14 swimmers.

Men

Women

Mixed

References

World Aquatics Championships
2022
Nations at the 2022 World Aquatics Championships